Fred Moore, alias Fabulous (born February 26, 1967), is a light heavyweight professional boxer from Minnesota.

Personal life
Moore was born in Philadelphia, Pennsylvania, but now makes his home in Rochester, Minnesota. He has 2 daughters,  Shaniqua, 19, Arnella, 14.

Professional career
Moore debuted in November 1994 and won the first 25 fights of his career before dropping a fight by TKO to Quincy Taylor in June 2001. In his career, Moore has fought Kenny Bowman, Quincy Taylor, Reggie Johnson, and Glen Johnson, among others. As of October 2007, Moore's professional record was 30 wins (27 by knockout) and 7 losses.

Fred Moore grew up in the Scotland School for Veterans' Children in Scotland, PA where he earned the title of the best fighter in the school.

Professional boxing record

|-
|align="center" colspan=8|30 Wins (27 knockouts, 3 decisions), 8 Losses (7 knockouts, 1 decision) 
|-
| align="center" style="border-style: none none solid solid; background: #e3e3e3"|Result
| align="center" style="border-style: none none solid solid; background: #e3e3e3"|Record
| align="center" style="border-style: none none solid solid; background: #e3e3e3"|Opponent
| align="center" style="border-style: none none solid solid; background: #e3e3e3"|Type
| align="center" style="border-style: none none solid solid; background: #e3e3e3"|Round
| align="center" style="border-style: none none solid solid; background: #e3e3e3"|Date
| align="center" style="border-style: none none solid solid; background: #e3e3e3"|Location
| align="center" style="border-style: none none solid solid; background: #e3e3e3"|Notes
|-align=center
|Loss
|
|align=left| Carl Daniels
|TKO
|6
|15/12/2007
|align=left| Grand Casino, Hinckley, Minnesota
|align=left|
|-
|Loss
|
|align=left| Glen "Road Warrior" Johnson
|KO
|5
|27/07/2007
|align=left| Sheraton Miami Mart Hotel, Miami, Florida
|align=left|
|-
|Loss
|
|align=left| Jaffa Ballogou
|KO
|4
|11/11/2005
|align=left| Horseshoe Bossier City, Bossier City, Louisiana
|align=left|
|-
|Loss
|
|align=left| "Sweet" Reggie Johnson
|KO
|9
|27/08/2005
|align=left| Paragon Casino Resort, Marksville, Louisiana
|align=left|
|-
|Loss
|
|align=left| George Khalid Jones
|TD
|9
|01/07/2005
|align=left| Memorial Hall, Plymouth, Massachusetts
|align=left|
|-
|Win
|
|align=left| James Lubwama
|UD
|10
|22/10/2004
|align=left| Municipal Auditorium-Recreation Club, Sarasota, Florida
|align=left|
|-
|Loss
|
|align=left| Prince Badi Ajamu
|TKO
|10
|27/07/2004
|align=left| A La Carte Event Pavilion, Tampa, Florida
|align=left|
|-
|Loss
|
|align=left| Laudelino Jose Barros
|KO
|5
|09/08/2003
|align=left| Miami Arena, Miami, Florida
|align=left|
|-
|Win
|
|align=left| Kwan Manassah
|TKO
|3
|16/06/2002
|align=left| Treasure Island Casino, Red Wing, Minnesota
|align=left|
|-
|Win
|
|align=left| Kwan Manassah
|TKO
|5
|07/09/2001
|align=left| Dakota Magic Casino, Hankinson, North Dakota
|align=left|
|-
|Win
|
|align=left| Mark Longo
|TKO
|5
|25/08/2001
|align=left| 4 Bears Casino & Lodge, New Town, North Dakota
|align=left|
|-
|Win
|
|align=left| Patrick Swann
|TKO
|6
|28/07/2001
|align=left| Rochester, Minnesota
|align=left|
|-
|Loss
|
|align=left| Quincy Taylor
|TKO
|4
|16/06/2001
|align=left| Treasure Island Casino, Red Wing, Minnesota
|align=left|
|-
|Win
|
|align=left| Nino Cirilo
|TKO
|3
|01/06/2001
|align=left| Bismarck Civic Center, Bismarck, North Dakota
|align=left|
|-
|Win
|
|align=left| Allen Smith
|TKO
|3
|30/03/2001
|align=left| Tama, Iowa
|align=left|
|-
|Win
|
|align=left| Kwan Manassah
|TKO
|5
|01/12/2000
|align=left| Minnesota
|align=left|
|-
|Win
|
|align=left| Nino Cirilo
|TKO
|5
|21/07/2000
|align=left| Minot, North Dakota
|align=left|
|-
|Win
|
|align=left| Donnie Giron
|TKO
|4
|07/10/1999
|align=left| Graham Arena, Rochester, Minnesota
|align=left|
|-
|Win
|
|align=left| Kenny Bowman
|KO
|4
|24/07/1999
|align=left| Shooting Star Casino, Mahnomen, Minnesota
|align=left|
|-
|Win
|
|align=left| Allen Smith
|TKO
|2
|19/06/1999
|align=left| Cuzzy's Bar, Minneapolis, Minnesota
|align=left|
|-
|Win
|
|align=left| Carlos Bates
|KO
|2
|22/05/1999
|align=left| Hyatt Regency Hotel, Minneapolis, Minnesota
|align=left|
|-
|Win
|
|align=left| Billy James Johnson
|TKO
|1
|10/04/1999
|align=left| Mandan Community Center, Mandan, North Dakota
|align=left|
|-
|Win
|
|align=left| Laverne Clark
|KO
|4
|01/10/1998
|align=left| Rochester, Minnesota
|align=left|
|-
|Win
|
|align=left| Anthony Wright
|KO
|1
|18/07/1998
|align=left| New Town, North Dakota
|align=left|
|-
|Win
|
|align=left| John Kiser
|PTS
|8
|04/10/1997
|align=left| Rochester, Minnesota
|align=left|
|-
|Win
|
|align=left| Nathaniel Miles
|TKO
|7
|13/09/1997
|align=left| Mandan, North Dakota
|align=left|
|-
|Win
|
|align=left| Jorge Manjarrez
|TKO
|1
|23/07/1997
|align=left| Maplewood, Minnesota
|align=left|
|-
|Win
|
|align=left| Richie Galvan
|TKO
|3
|28/03/1997
|align=left| Rochester, Minnesota
|align=left|
|-
|Win
|
|align=left| Quinton Osgood
|TKO
|2
|10/10/1996
|align=left| Rochester, Minnesota
|align=left|
|-
|Win
|
|align=left| Donnie Penelton
|PTS
|6
|24/08/1996
|align=left| New Town, North Dakota
|align=left|
|-
|Win
|
|align=left| Wayne Chartrand
|KO
|1
|23/07/1996
|align=left| Saint Paul, Minnesota
|align=left|
|-
|Win
|
|align=left| Gary Jones
|KO
|3
|20/04/1996
|align=left| Engelstad Arena, Grand Forks, North Dakota
|align=left|
|-
|Win
|
|align=left| Keith Smith
|TKO
|1
|02/03/1996
|align=left| Minneapolis, Minnesota
|align=left|
|-
|Win
|
|align=left| Duane Smith
|TKO
|2
|21/02/1996
|align=left| Columbia Club, Indianapolis, Indiana
|align=left|
|-
|Win
|
|align=left| David Willis
|TKO
|1
|16/01/1996
|align=left| Little Bit of Texas, Indianapolis, Indiana
|align=left|
|-
|Win
|
|align=left| Jim Hendrickson
|KO
|2
|16/12/1995
|align=left| Grand Forks Civic Auditorium, Grand Forks, North Dakota
|align=left|
|-
|Win
|
|align=left| David Willis
|TKO
|2
|14/07/1995
|align=left| Rochester, Minnesota
|align=left|
|-
|Win
|
|align=left|Paul Phonseya
|KO
|2
|18/11/1994
|align=left| Rochester, Minnesota
|align=left|
|}

Notes

1967 births
Living people
Boxers from Philadelphia
Light-heavyweight boxers
Boxers from Minnesota
Sportspeople from Rochester, Minnesota
American male boxers